Alina Plugaru (born 18 December 1987) is a Romanian entrepreneur and former pornographic film actress, who has been called in Romania "The Queen of Porn". She started acting in erotic videos in 2006, after having worked as a stripper and model.

Life and career
Plugaru was born in Vaslui, Romania. At the age of 15, Plugaru decided to pursue a career in modeling and she moved to Bucharest. On the day she turned sixteen she started working as an exotic dancer. She danced her way around the country for two years, gaining in popularity, until a visit to a porn set piqued her interest in a hardcore career. She started her porn career in 2006, just after her 18th birthday, with the porn star and director Zenza Raggi.

Plugaru appears regularly as a featured dancer in Romania and other countries. In the past few years she was a regular guest at the most important European erotic fairs such as The Eros Show Bucharest, The Barcelona International Erotic Film Festival (FICEB), The Lisbon International Erotic Festival (SIEL), The Eros Porto, The Eros & Amore Vienna and The Eros Show Sofia.

In the last years she won the Best Romanian Porn Actress Awards at the Romanian Erotic Industry Awards (PIER 2008 & PIER 2009). Plugaru was recognized for her contributions to the advancement of the Romanian adult entertainment industry.

In March 2009 she was voted The Ideal Romanian Woman and nearly a quarter (24.69%) of website visitors voted for her in an online poll.

On 24 September 2009 Plugaru announced her retirement from the adult film industry.

Plugaru founded the erotic dance troupe Erotic Dreams Show by Alina Plugaru in 2011 and she performs frequently with her erotic dance troupe at festivals, private parties and public venues. In May 2011 she received the Best Show Awards for her erotic dance troupe, at the Romanian Erotic Industry Awards (PIER 2011).

After her retirement from the adult film industry, she manages her business, one of the top rated erotic massage parlor in Bucharest.

In 2015, Plugaru was a contestant in the PRO TV reality series Sunt celebru, scoate-mă de aici! (the Romanian version of I'm a Celebrity...Get Me Out of Here!). She was voted off the show after 16 days by a public vote.

Television
 Sunt celebru, scoate-mă de aici! (2015) Studio: Pro TV
 Nimeni nu-i perfect (2009) Studio: Prima TV
 Making Of (2007) Studio: Open Media Productions
 Secretul Mariei (2005) Studio: La Dolce Vita Productions & Antena 1 TV

References

External links

 
 
 
 

1987 births
Living people
People from Vaslui
Romanian women in business
I'm a Celebrity...Get Me Out of Here!
Romanian pornographic film actresses
Models from Bucharest